The Love Trader is an early talkie pre-Code American romantic drama film preserved at the Library of Congress. It was directed by Joseph Henabery and starred silent greats Leatrice Joy, Henry B. Walthall, Barbara Bedford and Noah Beery. It was produced by an independent production company called Pacific Pictures and released through the Tiffany Pictures.

Cast
Leatrice Joy as Martha Adams
Roland Drew as Tonia
Henry B. Walthall as Captain Adams
Barbara Bedford as Luane
Noah Beery as Captain Morton
Chester Conklin as Nelson
Clarence Burton as John
William Welsh as Benson
Tom Mahoney as Sailor
Jack Curtis as Sailor

References

External links

Lobby poster(Wayback Machine,click)

1930 films
Films directed by Joseph Henabery
Tiffany Pictures films
1930 romantic drama films
American romantic drama films
American black-and-white films
1930s American films